Stand Your Ground is the sixth solo album (and second under the banner of 'Mike Tramp & The Rock 'N' Roll Circuz') by former Freak of Nature and current White Lion lead singer, Mike Tramp.

Background and recording
Released on 28 March 2011, the album was recorded virtually live in Medley Studios in Copenhagen, and co-produced by Søren Andersen and Mike Tramp. It was mixed by Jacob Hansen,  known for his work with bands such as Volbeat, Surfact and others.

Release and promotion
The track, "Distance", was released as the first single from the album, which also featured a promo video.

The Danish release of the album contains the bonus track, "Hymn to Ronnie" (also released as a single), which is a tribute to Ronnie James Dio, who died the previous year on 16 May 2010.

Track listing

Personnel
 Mike Tramp – vocals, guitar
 Claus Langeskov – bass guitar 
 Søren Andersen – guitar
 Morten Hellborn – drums 
 Emily Garriock – keyboards, vocals

References

2011 albums
Mike Tramp albums